The Basketball tournament at the 2003 All-Africa Games was held in Abuja, Nigeria from October 5 to 10. Angola won the men's tournament  and ended the round robin tournament with a 3–0 unbeaten record. Nigeria won the women's tournament.

Competition format
A round-robin tournament was played.

Calendar

Men's competition

Women's competition

Medal summary

Medal table

Events

Final standings

External links
 Men's tournament todor66.com
 Women's tournament todor66.com

References

Basketball at the African Games
2003 All-Africa Games
2003 in African basketball
International basketball competitions hosted by Nigeria